The Pink Panther: Hokus Pokus Pink is a musical adventure computer game for the PC released on October 18, 1997 by Wanderlust Interactive. It is based on the Pink Panther cartoon and is a sequel to The Pink Panther: Passport to Peril. It teaches children about six countries with the Pink Panther. The places Pink visits are: Siberia in Russia, the Dead Sea in Israel, Indonesia, Borneo, Kenya, and Ancient Greece.

Plot 
After the successful events in The Pink Panther: Passport to Peril, the Pink Panther gives up his life as an agent for Inspector Clouseau and gets a job as a door-to-door-salesman. However, his more slow-paced life is soon interrupted as Nathan, son of the wealthy lunatic dentist and antique teeth collector Dr. Periowinkle, steals utensils from the warlock Strangeblood and accidentally transforms the little girl Violet, daughter of a guest at Dr. Periowinkle's auction party in his mansion, into a giant, anthropomorphic wombat (with some bat-like physical features). It falls to the Pink Panther to find Strangeblood's book of spell reversals so that he can undo the transformation before Nathan's parents discover his activities.

Armed with a book of knowledge that contains information on the indigenous people, languages, clothing, entertainment, art, history, nature, and foods of each pertinent area, players must guide Pink on a quest spanning six countries across the globe to undo Nathan's magic. Players will need to find objects that can be used or traded to acquire items crucial to advancing the story. Helping Pink travel between locations is Spot, a sentient, speaking black hole that he steals from Strangeblood's magical laboratory in the forest outside Dr. Periowinkle's mansion.

Although Pink would rather undo Nathan's work directly, Violet wishes to become an "immortal, magical ninja princess mermaid". Pink succeeds in gathering the magic elements needed to complete the potion, including an improvised black belt, while receiving unexpected help from Strangeblood along the way to drain the Dead Sea. His success is only temporary, and the transformed Violet falls asleep in midair after consuming a poisonous apple. He is then tasked with finding the right ingredients to awaken Violet and is revisited on his journey by Strangeblood, who helps magically reattach a shark's fins. When the new potion fails, Pink again improvises with a third ingredient, this time a Greek salad, but this causes Violet to become possessed by Echidna of Greek mythology. Finally, Pink must outwit two gorgons and convince the Greek sea god Poseidon to travel with him to Dr. Periowinkle's mansion. After Pink takes Poseidon to the party, Strangeblood appears once again and exorcises Echidna, freeing Violet and restoring her original form. Poseidon arrests Echidna and departs.

When the auction party ends, Dr. Periowinkle and his wife reprimand Nathan for being the primary cause of so much chaos even though Nathan confesses that he only wanted to learn how to be a magician. Strangeblood consoles Nathan and explains that he intentionally caused the events of the story to test the boy's abilities as a wizard. He recruits Nathan as his apprentice and brainwashes Dr. and Mrs. Periowinkle into agreement. After Strangeblood takes Nathan to his forest laboratory, Pink expresses satisfaction with this adventure's happy ending.

The game features ten original songs and over 300 fact-filled pages containing information and photos of the countries in which players find themselves. It is also characterized by comic graphics similar to those from the animated shorts.

References 

1997 video games
Adventure games
Hokus Pokus Pink
MGM Interactive games
Point-and-click adventure games
ScummVM-supported games
Video games developed in the United States
Windows games
Windows-only games